William Russell (born William Lerche; April 12, 1884 – February 18, 1929) was an American actor, film director, film producer and screenwriter. He appeared in over two hundred silent-era motion pictures between 1910 and 1929, directing five of them in 1916 and producing two through his own production company in 1918 and 1925.

Early life and career
Born in the Bronx borough of New York City, Russell began his acting career on the stage when he was eight years old. He appeared with such notables as Ethel Barrymore, Chauncey Olcott, Blanche Bates, Maude Adams and others.

Russell's Broadway credits include Princess Flavia (1925), Cyrano de Bergerac (1923), and The Tenderfoot (1904).

His career came to a stop when he was 16, however, when he became an invalid. Through rigorous physical therapy, he recovered his health six years later. He then became an amateur boxing champion.

Motion pictures
Russell began his screen career in New York with the Biograph Company, where he worked for nine months before signing with the Thanhouser Company. He was also part of the company of players for the American Film Manufacturing Company and its Flying "A" Studios in Santa Barbara.

In 1917, he and actress Charlotte Burton were married. They divorced in 1921. He and actress Helen Ferguson were married on June 21, 1925, at the Wilshire Boulevard Congregational Church, after a six-year romance.

William Russell died at the age of 44 from pneumonia at Hollywood Hospital in Los Angeles. He is entombed in the Great Mausoleum, Sanctuary of Love, at Forest Lawn Cemetery, Glendale. His brother, director Albert Russell, died two weeks later from pneumonia.

Selected filmography

Actor

References

External links

William Russell Photo at New York Public Library

1884 births
1929 deaths
19th-century American male actors
American Christian Scientists
American male stage actors
American male silent film actors
Male actors from New York City
Deaths from pneumonia in California
20th-century American male actors
Burials at Forest Lawn Memorial Park (Glendale)
People from the Bronx
Silent film screenwriters
20th-century screenwriters